The Preamble to the United Nations Charter is the opening (preamble) of the 1945 United Nations Charter.

History
Jan Smuts from South Africa originally wrote the opening lines of the Preamble as, "The High Contracting Parties, determined to prevent a recurrence of the fratricidal strife which twice in our generation has brought untold sorrow and loss upon mankind. . ." which would have been similar to the opening lines of the Covenant of the League of Nations. After considerable argument at the United Nations Conference on International Organization, held in San Francisco, Virginia Gildersleeve from the US was successful in changing and shortening the Preamble, however, with much of Smuts' original text reattached at the end.

The opening phrase "We the peoples of the United Nations ..", echoing the preamble of the United States Constitution, was suggested by US congressman and Conference delegate Sol Bloom. The preambulatory phrase "In Larger Freedom" became the title of a UN reform proposal by the seventh Secretary-General, Kofi Annan.

Text

The Preamble reads as follows:

Notes

External links

 Preamble of the charter of The United Nations: calligraphic manuscript by Hermann Zapf. Frankfurt am Main, 1960. Morgan Library & Museum, New York.

Divisions and sections of the Charter of the United Nations
Jan Smuts
United Nations

de:Präambel zur Charta der Vereinten Nationen